Van Gogh National Park (Dutch: Van Gogh Nationaal Park) is a proposed Dutch national park, presented on 30 March 2021.

The park would consist of several natural areas in the province of North Brabant, including De Loonse en Drunense Duinen National Park and Het Groene Woud. In addition to nature, the park is intended to promote cultural heritage, sustainability, as well as the local economy.

The project is named after painter Vincent van Gogh (1853–1890), a native of North Brabant who worked and lived in a number of locations within the area it would cover.

References

External links
Official website

2021 establishments in the Netherlands
National parks of the Netherlands
Regions of North Brabant
Parks in North Brabant
Tourist attractions in North Brabant
Vincent van Gogh